Pandacan station (also called Beata station) is a railway station located on the South Main Line in the city of Manila, Philippines.

This is the fifth station southbound from Tutuban.

History
Pandacan was opened on March 25, 1908 as a station originally situated on the Manila Belt Line (from Tutuban to Paco), originally operated by Manila Railroad Company. From this station, two now-defunct spur lines connecting nearby oil companies in Pandacan branched out from the station.

Nearby landmarks
Near the station are landmarks such as the San Miguel Yamamura Packaging Corporation - Manila Plastics Plant, Jacinto Ciria Cruz Recreation Complex, and the residential communities of Pandacan. Located further away from the station are the Jacinto Zamora Elementary School, the Pandacan Linear Park, and the former Pandacan oil depot.

Transportation links
Pandacan station is accessible by jeepneys plying routes on Padre Zamora Street and Beata Street, and Pandacan Transport Services Cooperative Inc. (PanTSCI) buses also plying Beata Street route to or from Carriedo Street in Santa Cruz, Manila. Tricycles also drop passengers off at the station.

References

Philippine National Railways stations
Railway stations in Metro Manila
Railway stations opened in 2009
Buildings and structures in Pandacan